Marko Đorđević (also transliterated Marko Djordjević; born 22 May 1983) is a Serbian footballer who plays as a centre back.

Career
In November 2014, Đorđević signed for Auckland City.

Career statistics

Honours
Amicale
 Vanuatu Premia Divisen: 2013–14
Auckland City
 ASB Premiership (1): 2014–15
 OFC Champions League (1): 2014–15

References

External links
 
 
 
 Marko Đorđević at Utakmica.rs 

1983 births
Living people
Sportspeople from Kruševac
Association football defenders
Serbian footballers
FK Napredak Kruševac players
FK Jagodina players
FK Radnički 1923 players
Serbian SuperLiga players
Serbian expatriate footballers
Serbian expatriate sportspeople in Kazakhstan
Expatriate footballers in Kazakhstan
Expatriate footballers in Vanuatu
FC Kairat players
FC Okzhetpes players
Auckland City FC players
New Zealand Football Championship players